The Triplex type font style is a typeface designed by Zuzana Licko and John Downer in 1985 and 1989. It is distributed by Emigre. It is used by Avex & Prezi for its logo. It was also used as the typeface for Disney Channel from 1997-2002. It has both Sans-serif and Serif variation.

John Downer first designed sans-serif Triplex Italic in 1985, then Zuzana Licko designed the other fonts in the family, including Triplex Sans and Triplex Serif.

Variations

Sans-serif 
The list below is all the sans-serif variations of Triplex typeface.

 Normal width:
 Triplex Sans Light
 Triplex Sans Bold
 Triplex Sans Extra Bold
 Condensed width:
 Triplex Condensed Sans Regular
 Triplex Condensed Sans Black
 Italic:
 Triplex Italic Light
 Triplex Italic Bold
 Triplex Italic Extra Bold

Serif 
The list below is all the Serif variations of Triplex typeface.

 Normal width:
 Triplex Serif Light
 Triplex Serif Bold
 Triplex Serif Extra Bold
 Condensed width:
 Triplex Condensed Serif Regular
 Triplex Condensed Serif Black

See also 
 Emigre (type foundry)
 Zuzana Licko

References

External links 
 Official website of Triplex
 Official website of Triplex Italic

Sans-serif typefaces
Serif typefaces
Emigre typefaces
Typefaces designed by Zuzana Licko
Typefaces and fonts introduced in 1989
Typefaces designed by John Downer